Kermit Roger Williams (born January 9, 1954) is an American politician in the state of New Hampshire. He is a member of the New Hampshire House of Representatives, sitting as a Democrat from the Hillsborough 4 district, having been first elected in 2012 and serving until 2020.

References

Living people
1954 births
People from Carthage, New York
People from Wilton, New Hampshire
Democratic Party members of the New Hampshire House of Representatives
21st-century American politicians